Puncak Jaya Regency is one of the regencies (kabupaten) in the Indonesian province of Central Papua. It is an inland highland regency, lying directly east of Paniai Regency and west of Jayawijaya Regency and Tolikara Regency (including those new regencies which have subsequently been created within the former boundaries of those regencies). As of 2004, it was reported that these four regencies had a population that is 93–97% ethnic Papua; however this included areas which have subsequently been formed into new regencies.

In 2008 an additional regency - simply named Puncak Regency - was created from the western part of the area of Puncak Jaya Regency. The residual Puncak Jaya Regency covers an area of 6,515 km2, and had a population of 101,148 at the 2010 Census which increased to 224,527 at the 2020 Census.

The capital of the regency is Mulia.

According to a 2009 profile in Indonesia's Tempo magazine, Puncak Jaya had sixteen districts (kecamatan) and 147 villages, and 147,000 residents; however this did not take account of the fact that under the Law No. 7/2008, eight of these districts had already been removed from Puncak Jaya Regency in 2008 and formed into a separate Puncak Regency in 2008. The 2010 Census revealed a population of 101,148 in the residual Puncak Jaya Regency, which by the 2020 Census had more than doubled to 224,527. It is a difficult ten-hour drive from Wamena (Jayawijaya Regency) to the mostly undeveloped regency. Separatists in the Free Papua Movement are active in the area.

Administrative districts
At the 2010 Census, the existing regency comprised eight districts (kecamatan), tabulated below with their populations at the 2010 Census.

However, by 2018 these had been split to create additional districts, which in 2018 numbered twenty-six, listed below with their areas and their populations at the 2020 Census. The nineteen new districts created by 2018 are Dagai, Dokome, Gubume, Gurage, Ilamburawi, Irimuli, Kalome, Kiyage, Lumo, Molanikime, Muara, Nioga, Nume, Pagaleme, Taganombak, Waegi, Wanwi, Yambi and Yamoneri; the previous Jigonikme District has ceased to exist.

Towns included
 Aginilia
 Buguba
 Jebegot
 Lambo
 Mulia
 Mbambawa
 Motorbivak
 Rustoord
 Splitsingbivak
 Tombage

Climate
Mulia, the seat of the regency has a subtropical highland climate (Cfb) with heavy rainfall year-round.

References

External links
 Detail maps from Indonesian government, this regency: (includes northern portion)  (includes southern portion, including location of Mulia)
Statistics publications from Statistics Indonesia (BPS)

Regencies of Central Papua